Interactions between the followers of Hinduism and Islam began in the 7th century, after the advent of the latter in the Arabian Peninsula. These interactions were mainly by trade throughout the Indian Ocean. Historically, these interactions formed contrasting patterns in northern and southern India. In the north of India, there is a history of conquest and a legacy of Hindus living under the domination of Muslim rulers stretching back to the Delhi Sultanate of the 13th century. The relations between Hindus and Muslims have historically been largely peaceful in Kerala and Tamil Nadu.

Hinduism and Islam share some ritual practices, such as fasting and pilgrimage, but their views differ on various aspects. Their interaction since the British colonial rule in India has witnessed periods of cooperation and syncretism, and periods of religious discrimination, intolerance, and violence. As a religious minority in India, Muslims are part of the Indian culture and have lived with Hindus for over 13 centuries. The boundaries between Islam and Hinduism remained flexible to some extent until the period of British colonial rule.

The religions
Hinduism is an Indian religion and a way of life of the Hindu people primarily practiced in the Indian subcontinent and other regions which have experienced Hindu influence since ancient and medieval times. Hinduism mostly shares common terms with the Dhārmic religions that it influenced, including Buddhism, Sikhism, and Jainism. The scriptures of Hinduism are the Śruti (the four Vedas, which comprise the original Vedic Hymns, or Samhitas, and three tiers of commentaries upon the Samhitas, namely the Brāhmaṇas, Āraṇyakas, and Upanishads); these are considered authentic knowledge and wisdom of the past, collated, compiled and codified into written form, for future generations. Furthermore, Hinduism is also based on the Smṛti literature, which includes the Rāmāyana, Mahābhārata, Bhagavad Gītā, and Purānas, also considered to be sacred Hindu texts.

Islam is a monotheistic religion that originated in the Arabian peninsula, in which God is Allah, and the final Islamic prophet is Muhammad, whom Muslims believe delivered the central Islamic scripture, the Qurān. Islam shares common terms with the Abrahamic religions which pre-date it.  The Quran and the Ḥadīth literature are the primary Islamic scriptures, while the sunnah consists of the Islamic traditional customs and practices which all Muslims are expected to follow.

Comparison between Islam and Hinduism

Concepts of God and deities

God 

Hinduism is a system of thought in which the concept of God varies according to its diverse traditions. Hinduism spans a wide range of beliefs such as henotheism, monotheism, polytheism, panentheism, pantheism, pandeism, monism, atheism and nontheism. One popular theological interpretation is the Advaita Vedanta tradition, which relies mainly on the Upanishads and declares absolute monism, exemplified in the concept of Brahman (the ultimate reality). When a person is devoid of ignorance (Avidyā), they find the truth by realizing that their true nature, pure soul, or inner Self (Ātman) is identical to Brahman. Until then, they are usually ignorant of the ultimate reality and therefore believe that the material world around them is real and indulges in it, when the world is actually an illusion (Māyā). The Brahman, which is absolute and pure, and the Ātman, which is also absolute and pure, are the same in this school of Hindu thought, which exemplifies the Hindu concept of God.

Islam is a system of thought that believes in the concept of the unity and uniqueness of God (Tawḥīd), which declares monotheism, and is considered to be the defining doctrine of the Islamic religion. God in Islam is conceived as the absolute one, the all-powerful and all-knowing ruler of the universe, and the creator of everything in existence. According to Islam, God is transcendent, so Muslims do not attribute human forms to God. God is described and referred to by several names or attributes. One of the five pillars of Islam is that Muslims affirm the Shahada in the five canonical daily prayers, which declares that "There is no other god but Allah, and Muhammad is the messenger of Allah."

Although there are a number of diverse conceptions of God and deities within Hinduism, most fuqaha (Muslim jurists), such as Muslim heresiographer al-Shahrastani, consider all of them to be polytheistic and blasphemous. Most agree that they should be considered dhimmi. Some Muslim thinkers living in India, such as, Diya' al-Din Barani (1285?-1357?), disagree with that, demanding that a Muslim ruler should slaughter the leaders of Hinduism (Brahmanists) to fight infidelity. 

Hindus, on the other hand, have criticized Muslims for attempting to describe God, whereby violating God's indescribable and incomparable being.

Despite the obvious discrepancy between Islamic monotheism and Hinduistic polytheism, some Muslim authors showed approval of the Hindu religion:

Al-Biruni famously recorded the beliefs of Hindus in a descriptive manner. He notes that although the common people would worship idols, the educated people would be "entirely free from worshipping anything but God 
alone and would never dream of worshipping an image manufactured to represent him." He doesn't blame idolatry on Hinduism, but to a lack of proper education. The difference between monotheistic religions and Hinduism wouldn't be that strong, since all uneducated people, even among Judaism, Christianity, and Islam, would need concrete objects to worship. 

Amir Khusraw Dihlawi (1253-1325) writes that Hindus have gone astray, but so have other religions and Hinduism would still consist of beliefs shared by Muslims: They would believe in the oneness and eternity of God as creator and sustainer. For that reason, he favors Hinduism before materialists (dahriyya),  dualists (thanawiyya), Christianity who attribute to God spirit and progeny, and the star-worshippers (akhtariyyan) who acknowledge seven deities. The Hindu (precisely Brahmanist) would worship animals, stones, and the sun, but the Brahmanist accepts that they don't really bear likeness to God and are God's creation, they are only worshipped due to tradition.

Deities 
Divine spirits in Hindu-lore were integrated into the monotheistic Islamic worldview by Muslim authors writing about Hinduism. They acknowledged that these spirits would exude a mesmerizing  fascination on people, even Muslims couldn't withstand. Arab Muslim geographer al-Maqdisī ( CE) wrote about Indian deities,  that they have the power to enchant people, even Muslims, to worship them. A Muslim is said to have visited them and abandoned Islam. Besides their power to distract even Muslims from worshiping Allah, they may have real magical powers and even grand their worshippers wishes.

In al-Tabasi's (d. 1089) compendium about magic and sorcery Mahakal, an epiphet for the Hindu deity Shiva, is mentioned. Abu Sa'id al Gardizi (fl. 1049) further elaborates that this deva (dīv) would have the power to teach incantations ('aza'im) and how to perform wonders ('aja'ib). 

To harmonize the existence of such spirits with the monotheistic worldview of Islam, it was assumed that the Indian deities were created by Allah, however, prior to the beings revealed in the Quran. Abu Ali Bal'ami (d. 992–997) asserts that the deva (div) were created long before the angels and jinn. Unlike jinn, the div would have refused to obey the Prophet Solomon.

Scriptures and messengers
The sacred scriptures of Islam are the Qurān and the Ḥadīths, which report what Muhammad said and did. Ḥadīths are varied and have many versions. According to Islamic doctrine, Jesus Christ was also one of the messengers from God. Muslims believe that Muhammad was the last messenger and the Qurān was the last revelation from God, delivered to him through the angel Jibrīl. The Ḥadīths contain the sunnah, the reports of Muhammad's life, sayings, actions, and examples he set. The Qurān and the reliable Ḥadīths are considered in Islam as the sources of Islamic law or Sharīʿah.

Unlike Islam, Hinduism doesn't have centralized religious authorities, or governing bodies. It has some defining historical and religious texts, the sacred Hindu scriptures, traditional ecclesiastical order, incarnations, and the legal code Manusmṛti. Spiritual knowledge of Hinduism is contained in texts called Śruti ("what is heard") and Smṛti ("what is remembered"). These sacred texts discuss diverse topics, including theology, cosmology, mythology, philosophy, rituals and rites of passage, and many others. Major scriptures in Hinduism include the Vedas and Upanishads (both Śruti), the Epics (Rāmāyana and Mahābhārata), Purāṇas, Dharmaśāstras, Āgamas, and the Bhagavad Gītā (all Smṛti).

Similarities

According to Islam, after death, one either enters Paradise (Jannah) or Hell (Jahannam), depending on their deeds. Unlike Muslims, Hindus believe in a cycle of reincarnation. However, the concept of higher and lower realms of existence can be found in Hinduism, though the realms are temporary places.

Both Muslims and Hindus acknowledge demons (Shaitan/Asura), who are constantly inciting war between the desires of humans and the Divine. Asuras are part of Hindu mythology along with Devas, Yakshas and Rakshasas, and are featured in one of many cosmological theories in Hinduism. Asuras are sometimes considered nature spirits. They constantly battle with the devas.

Both believe in the existence of an entirety supreme power, either called Brahman or Allah. Brahman is a metaphysical concept that is the single binding unity behind the diversity in all that exists in the universe. Allah is the Arabic word for God in Abrahamic religions. Assimilated in local lore, the Islamic concept of God became comparable to the notion of the ultimate reality expressing itself through different names as the creator, the maintainer, and the destroyer. Some Islamic scholars believe that the worlds created by God will perish and be created anew, resembling the Hindu notion of an endless process of generation and decay.  

Pilgrimage is found in both religions: Hajj & Umrah to Mecca in Islam and Kumbh Mela and Tirtha Yatra in Hinduism.
Muslims walk seven times around the Kaaba during Hajj, which is called Tawaf. Hindus walk one or more times around the center (Garbhagriya) of a temple (one to twenty-one), called Parikrama (known in Sanskrit as pradakśiṇā). Both of them are commonly called circumambulation.

According to some members of the Ahmadiya Muslim Community, The Islamic prophet Muhammad is believed to be the Hindu Avatar Kalki. Some Muslim scholars and a few Hindu scholars also argue that mentions of Kalki refer to Muhammad in some Hindu scriptures. Ved Prakash Upaddhayya, a Hindu scholar, claimed Muhammad as Kalki in his book Kalki Avatar Aur Muhammad Saheb, whose arguments were divisive among both Hindu and Muslim scholars.

Sufism

The 10th-century Persian polymath Al-Biruni in his book Tahaqeeq Ma Lilhind Min Makulat Makulat Fi Aliaqbal Am Marzula (Critical Study of Indian Speech: Rationally Acceptable or Rejected) discusses the similarity of some Sufism concepts with aspects of Hinduism, such as: Atman with ruh, tanasukh with reincarnation, Moksha with Fanaa, Ittihad with Nirvana: union between Paramatman in Jivatma, Avatar or Incarnation with Hulul, Vedanta with Wahdat al-Wujud, Mujahadah with Sadhana.

Other scholars have likewise compared the Sufi concept of Waḥdat al-Wujūd with Advaita Vedanta, Fanaa to Samadhi, Muraqaba to Dhyana and tariqa to the Noble Eightfold Path.

Sufi theologian Martin Lings says,

Al-Biruni observed in his history of India that the fundamental ideas behind metempsychosis or reincarnation in Hinduism are not very different from the concept of the immanence of God in all things and the idea of a universal soul in some Sufi doctrines, and that for Sufis who believe in such things, "the course of metempsychosis is of no consequence".

The Sufi poet Jalaluddin Rumi wrote verse that played on such themes:

The 9th-century Iranian mystic Bayazid Bostami is alleged to have imported certain concepts from Hindusim into his version of Sufism under the conceptual umbrella of baqaa, meaning perfection. Ibn al-Arabi and Mansur al-Hallaj both referred to Muhammad as having attained perfection and titled him as Al-Insān al-Kāmil. The Sufism concept of hulul has similarly been compared with the idea of Ishvaratva, that God dwells in some creatures in Hinduism and Buddhism, and godhood of Jesus in Christianity.

Ziaur Rahman Azmi says that the reason behind Hindus' negative perception of Islam is mostly the spread of Sufism in India, as he believes Sufism "distorts" the Islamic ideas of Risalat and Tawheed. He claims Sufism includes idolatry, pointing to Sufi mausoleums and the practices of Tawaf and Sijda that occur at them.

Differences

Apostasy

Apostasy, defined in Islam as the conscious act by a Muslim of leaving Islam or blaspheming against it, is a religious crime according of some Islamic schools of law.

Hinduism does not have a "unified system of belief encoded in a declaration of faith or a creed" and is thus more tolerant to apostasy. Some Hindu sects believe that ethical conversion, without force or reward, is completely acceptable. However, the Vashistha Dharmasastra, the Apastamba Dharmasutra, and Yajnavalkya state that a son of an apostate is also considered an apostate. Smr̥ticandrikā lists apostates as a group of people upon touching whom, one should take a bath. Nāradasmṛti and Parasara-samhita state that a wife can remarry if her husband becomes an apostate. The Saint Parashara commented that religious rites are disturbed if an apostate witnesses them. He also comments that those who forgo the Rig Veda, Samaveda, and Yajurveda are "nagna" (naked) or an apostate.

Both religions state that there should be no compulsion in religion, although Islamic scholars may call for punishments against Muslims who have blasphemed.

Blasphemy

Blasphemy against God and against Muhammad is a religious crime in Islam. The Quran in verse and many Hadiths discuss blasphemy and its punishment. A variety of actions, speeches, or behavior can constitute blasphemy in Islam. Some examples include insulting or cursing Allah or the Prophets.

Drawing offensive cartoons, tearing or burning holy literature of Islam, and creating or using music, painting, video, or novels to mock or criticize prophet Muhammad are some examples of blasphemous acts. Punishment can range from imprisonment or flogging to execution.

Open discussion and criticism of spiritual thoughts, ideas, and deities are allowed in Hinduism. The concept of "divine blasphemy" or "heresy" does not exist in Hinduism, and ancient Hindu texts make no provisions for blasphemy.

Caste and creed

Hindu texts such as the Manusmriti segregate people through social stratification and class, i.e. Brahmins, Kshatriyas, Vaishyas, Shudras. Islamic texts do not segregate Muslims. Hadīth, however, mentions the prophecy of the Muslim Ummah being separated into 73 sects based on practices of Islam, not class. There are differences in practices within Muslim communities as traditions differ according to geography, but spiritually all Muslims are equal.

While Hinduism texts do not list thousands of castes, in practice, the Hindu caste system has been described as four Varnas or as thousands of endogamous hereditary groups called jātis.

Circumcision
Khitan, the religious rite of circumcision, is considered obligatory or recommendable for male Muslims. The Qur'an does not mention circumcision explicitly in any verse, but it is noted in the Hadiths of Islam. Circumcision is not compulsory in Islam, but is an important ritual aimed at improving cleanliness. It is strongly encouraged but not enforced.

Circumcision is not a religious requirement in Hinduism. Hinduism discourages non-medical circumcision, as, according to them, the body is made by the almighty God, and nobody has the right to alter it.

Consanguineous marriage
Consanguineous marriages are those where the bride and groom share a grandparent or near ancestor. Islam prohibits marriage due to consanguinity with ancestors, descendants, siblings, siblings of ancestors and descendants of siblings. However, marriage with first-cousins (3rd degree consanguinity) and farther removed consanguineous relatives is allowed. Hinduism forbids consanguineous marriage of parallel cousins, and strongly recommends seven degrees of biological separation between bride and groom. However, for many communities in South India, especially in Karnataka, Tamil Nadu, Telangana and Andhra Pradesh, it is common for Hindu cross cousins to marry, with matrilateral cross cousin (mother's brother's daughter) marriages being especially favored. In the region, "uncle-niece and first-cousin unions are preferential and jointly account for some 30% of marriages." These practices are particularly followed in landed communities such as the Vellalars, who wish to keep wealth within the family. Also, unlike North India, this practice is also common in Brahmins in the region.

Arranged endogamous consanguineous marriages are very common among Muslims, particularly first cousin marriages, followed by second cousin marriages. About 25 to 40% of all marriages in Pakistan, Saudi Arabia and UAE are first cousin marriages; while overall consanguineous arranged marriages exceed 65 to 80% in various regions of the Islamic Middle East, North Africa and Central Asia.

Jizya
Islamic scriptures compel the payment of a special tax called Jizya from dhimmi, who are not liable to pay Zaka'at, the non-Muslims who live in a Muslim state. Jizya was a tool of social stratification and treasury revenue from non-Muslims. Jizya was a reminder of the subordination of a non-Muslim under Muslims and created a financial and political incentive to convert to Islam.

There is no such concept of "Jizya" in Hindu texts.

Slavery

Muslim and Hindus societies have practiced slavery many times in history

The practice of slavery in early and late Vedic era of Hinduism is documented. However, some Hindu texts use the term dasa. Some scholars translate this as slave, while other scholars have translated it as servant and religious devotee. Arthashastra text of Hinduism dedicates a chapter to dasa where a financially bankrupt individual may become a servant of another. Arthashastra grants a dasa legal rights, and declares abusing, hurting and raping a dasa as a crime.

Islam's approach to slavery added the idea that freedom was the natural state of affairs for human beings and in line with this it limited the opportunities to enslave people, commended the freeing of slaves and regulated the way slaves were treated:

 Islam greatly limited those who could be enslaved and under what circumstances (although these restrictions were often evaded)
 Islam treated slaves as human beings as well as property
 Islam banned the mistreatment of slaves – indeed the tradition repeatedly stresses the importance of treating slaves with kindness and compassion
 Islam allowed slaves to achieve their freedom and made freeing slaves a virtuous act
 Islam barred Muslims from enslaving other Muslims

The Quran and the Hadiths strongly discourage the institution of slaves. Islam, in many cases, encouraged a slave's manumission. Islam only allows slavery through certain means and many Islamic scholars claim Islam blocked many ways through which people used to own slaves.

Food-related issues

Islam has restrictions on food, such as how meat is prepared. Halal meat is prepared by ritual slaughter that involves cutting the jugular veins of the animal with a sharp knife. This leads to death via bleeding. Meat from animals that die of natural causes or by accident is not allowed.

In Hinduism, food habits are left as a choice for Hindus and both meat and alcohol consumption is accepted. However, some Hindu communities prefer vegetarianism or lacto-vegetarianism due to their belief in ahimsa or non-violence. There are varied opinions regarding the permissibility of eating meat in Hinduism, depending upon the interpretation of the Hindu scriptures. Some Hindu sects emphasize vegetarianism. Some Hindus avoid eating cow-based beef, but they may eat water buffalo-based beef or pork as an alternative.

Slaughtering a cow is considered to be a religious taboo by all Hindus, who consider the cow to be a sacred animal.

In popular culture

Music

There have been instances of syncretic cooperation on music with Islamic and Hindu themes. For example, the national poet of Bangladesh, Kazi Nazrul Islam, wrote many Islamic devotional songs for mainstream Bengali folk music. He also explored Hindu devotional music by composing Shyama Sangeet, Durga Vandana, Sarswati Vandana, bhajans and kirtans, often merging Islamic and Hindu values. Nazrul's poetry and songs explored the philosophy of Islam and Hinduism.

See also

 Criticism of Hinduism
 Criticism of Islam
 Din-i Ilahi
 Divisions of the world in Islam
 Hindu–Muslim unity
 Hinduism and other religions
 Islam and other religions
 Islam in South Asia
 Persecution of Hindus by Muslims
 Sufism in India
 Violence against Muslims in India

References

Bibliography 
 Relations
 
 
 

 Islam in South Asia
 
 
 

 Communal violence